Phenylobacterium is a Gram negative, strictly aerobic non-motile and bacterial genus from the family of Caulobacteraceae which can grow on chloridazon–mineral salts.

References

Further reading 
 
 

Caulobacterales
Bacteria genera